
Augustów County is a unit of territorial administration and local government (powiat) in Podlaskie Voivodeship, north-eastern Poland, on the border with Belarus. It came into being on 1 January 1999 as a result of the Polish local government reforms passed in 1998.

As of 2019 its total population is 58,205.

Neighbouring counties
Augustów County is bordered by Sokółka County to the south-east, Mońki County to the south, Grajewo County and Ełk County to the west, Suwałki County to the north, and Sejny County to the north-east. It also borders Belarus to the east.

Administrative division
The county is subdivided into seven gminas (one urban, one urban-rural and five rural). These are listed in the following table, in descending order of population.

References

 
Land counties of Podlaskie Voivodeship